On December 5, 1456, the largest earthquake to occur on the Italian Peninsula struck the Kingdom of Naples. The earthquake had an estimated moment magnitude of  7.19–7.4, and was centred near the town of Pontelandolfo in the present-day Province of Benevento, southern Italy. Earning a level of XI (Extreme) on the Modified Mercalli intensity scale, the earthquake caused widespread destruction in central and southern Italy. An estimated 30,000–70,000 people were killed. It was followed by two strong  7.0 and 6.0 earthquakes to the north on December 30.

Tectonic setting
The central Italian Peninsula is dominated by active extensional tectonics, forming the Apennine Mountains. The mountain range formed during the Miocene and Pliocene due to the subduction of the Adriatic Plate beneath the Eurasian Plate. The resulting subduction formed a fold and thrust belt. During the Quaternary, thrust tectonics gave way to extensional tectonics, with the development of a zone of normal faulting running along the crest of the mountain range. One explanation is that slab rollback is occurring within the Adriatic Plate as it subducts beneath the Tyrrhenian Sea. Another explanation is because the back-arc basin in the Tyrrhenian Sea is opening at a faster rate than the African Plate is colliding with the Eurasian Plate. Extensional tectonics in the region have been active since the since the Pliocene epoch, mainly accommodated by northwest–southeast striking normal faults. The faults associated with large earthquakes on the peninsula are geologically young in age, and rarely rupture the surface. Occasionally, strike-slip events like the 1456 sequence, as well as the 1971 ( 5.0) and 2012 ( 4.6) moderate earthquakes in the southern Apennine region suggest the dominant style of faulting is not limited to normal dip-slip.

Earthquakes

December 5
The earthquake of December 5 was estimated at  7.19 ± 0.1 by the 2014 version of the National Institute of Geophysics and Volcanology earthquake catalog. The earthquake occurred in a region of active crustal movement along east–west striking strike-slip faults. Its magnitude has been estimated to be as high as  7.4.

Based on studying the macroseismic effects two hypotheses were postulated; the occurrence of one large mainshock, or three distinct shocks closely-spaced in time. The single-mainshock hypothesis could only be rationalized by a deep event occurring at ~ depth. This hypothetical depth would be greater than the average in the Apennines. Northwest-southeast trending normal faults are thought to be the source of the quake. The 1456 earthquake subsequently triggered future earthquakes nearby due to the behavior of faults in the area.

These depths are consistent with the average focal depths of earthquakes in the Apennines. The rupture process involved a complex cascade of independent faults rupturing subsequentially; as many as five subevents constituted the mainshock. The earthquake rupture extended from Abruzzo to Irpinia. The December 5 event occurred along a west-northwest-east-southeast striking oblique right-lateral fault. It ruptured east of the fault that caused the earthquake of 1688.

Subsequent events
Many large aftershocks accompanied the earthquake of December 5. A similar fault located further north, in Matese generated the shock of December 30. Intensity X–XI was felt in a northwest-southeast trending configuration from Macchiagodena to Castelluccio Acquaborrana. It was also felt in an east-west area from Boiano to Cercemaggiore. The widespread distribution of great intensity and its similarities with the December 5 event suggest the December 30 quake occurred at a deeper depth (>). Based on evaluating the reported intensities of the December 30 event, its magnitude is estimated to be no greater than  7.2. A third shock was recorded in the area affected by the December 30 event. This earthquake was felt VIII–IX over a wide area as well, suggesting a deep focal origin. A  of 6.0 was estimated.

Effects

The December 5 shock struck at 23:00 local time, lasting approximately 150 seconds. Devastation was reported in five of the 20 regions of Italy; Abruzzo, Molise, Campania, Apulia, and Basilicata; whereas some damage occurred in Lazio and Calabria. The area of devastation was unusually large compared to most earthquakes in Italy; thought to be caused by the occurrence of multiple ruptures.

The unusually large area of the meizoseismal area is caused by multiple faults, separated by significant distances rupturing. The commune of Caramanico Terme experienced a maximum intensity of XI. Intensity IX–X was felt in the towns of Tocco da Casauria, Torre de' Passeri and Castiglione a Casauria. From the lower Aterno Valley (in the north), to Sulmona, and Navelli (in the southeast), the intensity was VIII–IX.

As many as 70,000 people perished in the earthquake. In the town of Isernia, catastrophic damage occurred; 1,500 residents of the total 2,035 perished. Between 100 and 150 people died in Naples due to many homes and churches collapsing. Another 100 people died in Pozzuoli. There were between 600 and 2,200 fatalities in Apice; 2,000 in Barberio; more than 1,000 in Lafino; over 1,000 in Lafino; 1,200 in Isernia 400 in Cerreto Sannita; and 1,200 in Acerenza. The city of Ariano was razed—between 600 and 2,200 residents perished. A metrical inscription by Bishop Orso Leone placed in the Ariano Cathedral numbered the dead at a thousand. The town was rebuilt by 1470. The towns of Acquaviva, Apice, Biccari, Campobasso and Casalduni suffered massive destruction or were totally destroyed.

The earthquake of December 30 struck at 21:30 which measured ~ 7.0 was not as severe in Naples. Regions closer to the epicenter reported in serious damage. Documentation of heavy destruction in Sannio and the Campana Plain might be due to conflicting reports of the previous event. Major damage occurred in Isernia. There was no damage in the areas between Castel di Sangro and Sulmona. Additional damage also occurred due to the aftershocks, which persisted up till early 1457. The aftershock sequence only ended in May 1457.

Tsunami
A series of anomalous waves in the port of Naples also caused boats to crash. There was also reports of a tsunami in the Gulf of Taranto, where it struck the Ionian coastline.

Aftermath
Several villages in the affected area were abandoned. Alfonso V of Aragon, the King of Aragon, received news of the disaster while he was residing in Apulia. He would only return to Naples in early February 1457, where he declined tax exemption requests by survivors in the affected towns. Alfonso V stated that the survivors were able to pay taxes as they inherited the fortune of those who were killed. Reconstructions by the authorities were limited; only military fortresses, roads and bridges were supported in the interest of the military.

See also
 List of earthquakes in Italy
 List of earthquakes in Irpinia
 List of historical earthquakes

References

Earthquakes in Italy
1456 in Europe
History of Naples
Tsunamis in Italy
15th century in Italy
Isernia
Province of Benevento
History of Lazio
15th-century earthquakes
History of Calabria
History of Basilicata
History of Abruzzo
History of Molise
History of Apulia
History of Campania
Sulmona
Tocco da Casauria
Doublet earthquakes
Earthquake clusters, swarms, and sequences